Abraham V. Harpending (July 9, 1816 – April 23, 1871) was an American lawyer and politician from New York.

Life
He was born on July 9, 1816, in Plainview, then in Ontario County, now Dundee, in Yates County, New York, the son of Samuel Harpending (1778–1852) and Hannah (Cosad) Harpending (1782–1880).

He was first a Whig and then joined the Republican Party. He never married.

He was District Attorney of Yates County from 1854 to 1856; and a member of the New York State Assembly (Yates Co.) in 1857.

He was a member of the New York State Senate (26th D.) in 1870 and 1871. He was elected on December 28, 1869, to fill the vacancy caused by the resignation of Senator-elect Charles J. Folger.

Harpending died at the Congress Hall Hotel in Albany, New York, two days after the end of the session of 1871, and was buried at the Old Baptist Cemetery in Dundee.

References

 The New York Civil List compiled by Franklin Benjamin Hough, Stephen C. Hutchins and Edgar Albert Werner (1870; pg. 444, 486 and 544)
 Life Sketches of Executive Officers, and Members of the Legislature of the State of New York, Vol. III by H. H. Boone & Theodore P. Cook (1870; pg. 87)
 Cemetery records

External links
 

1816 births
1871 deaths
Republican Party New York (state) state senators
People from Yates County, New York
Republican Party members of the New York State Assembly
County district attorneys in New York (state)
19th-century American politicians